Same-sex marriage in New Zealand has been legal since 19 August 2013. A bill for legalisation was passed by the House of Representatives on 17 April 2013 by 77 votes to 44 and received royal assent on 19 April. It entered into force on 19 August, to allow time for the Department of Internal Affairs to make the necessary changes for marriage licensing and related documentation. New Zealand became the first country in Oceania, the fourth in the Southern Hemisphere, and the fifteenth overall to allow same-sex couples to marry. Civil unions have also been available for both same-sex and opposite-sex couples since 2005.

The New Zealand Parliament can enact marriage laws only in regard to New Zealand proper and the Ross Dependency in Antarctica. The three other territories making up the Realm of New Zealand—the Cook Islands, Niue, and Tokelau—do not recognise same-sex marriage or civil unions.

Civil unions

Civil unions were legalised for both same-sex and opposite-sex couples on 26 April 2005 following the passage of the Civil Union Act 2004 in the New Zealand Parliament. Couples in civil unions are granted several of the rights and obligations of marriage, including immigration rights, next-of-kin status, social welfare and property rights, amongst others.

Same-sex marriage

Quilter v Attorney-General
The case Quilter v Attorney-General had its origin in early 1996 when three female couples in long-term relationships, including Jenny Rowan and Juliet Joslin, were denied marriage licences by the Registrar-General because marriage under the common law was between one man and one woman. The case against the New Zealand Government was taken to the High Court in May 1996. The applicants argued that the Marriage Act 1955 did not prohibit same-sex marriage and that under the New Zealand Bill of Rights Act 1990 and the Human Rights Act 1993 discrimination on the basis of sexual orientation was prohibited.

Both parties agreed that at the time the Marriage Act 1955 was written in the 1950s, marriage according to the common law was between one man and one woman, which explained why the Act did not specifically outlaw same-sex marriage. The applicants argued, however, that under the Human Rights Act 1993, which prohibits discrimination based on sexual orientation, and sections 6 ("Interpretation consistent with Bill of Rights to be preferred") and 19 ("Freedom from discrimination") of the Bill of Rights, New Zealand prohibits discrimination based on sexual orientation and, therefore, the applicants should be allowed to marry. The government in response cited section 5 ("Justified limitations") of the Bill of Rights, which allows rights and freedoms in the Bill of Rights to "be subject only to such reasonable limits prescribed by law as can be demonstrably justified in a free and democratic society". In its decision, the High Court sided with the government and common law and reiterated that marriage is between one man and one woman. The High Court decision was appealed to the Court of Appeal (then New Zealand's highest court) in December 1997, which upheld the ruling.

Ms. Juliet Joslin et al. v. New Zealand
On 30 November 1998, two couples involved in Quilter v Attorney-General sued New Zealand before the United Nations Human Rights Committee claiming that the country's ban on same-sex marriage violated the International Covenant on Civil and Political Rights. The Committee rejected the case on 17 July 2002.

2005 election
During the 2005 election, Prime Minister Helen Clark said she thought it was discriminatory to exclude same-sex couples from the Marriage Act 1955, but said her government would not change the law due to public opinion. Instead, she praised civil unions.

Marriage (Gender Clarification) Amendment Bill 2005
In 2005, United Future MP Gordon Copeland sponsored the Marriage (Gender Clarification) Amendment Bill that would have amended New Zealand marriage law to define marriage as only between a man and a woman, and amend anti-discrimination protections in the Bill of Rights related to marital and family status so that the bill could stand. This was criticised by opponents, such as Attorney General Michael Cullen, as an overly "radical" attack on the Bill of Rights. The bill also would have prohibited the recognition of same-sex marriages from foreign countries as marriages in New Zealand. The bill received a Section 7 report for being inconsistent with the Bill of Rights, specifically freedom from discrimination relating to sexual orientation.

The bill had its first reading debate on 7 December 2005, and subsequently failed 47 votes in favour to 73 votes against.

Marriage (Definition of Marriage) Amendment Act 2013

On 14 May 2012, Labour Party MP Louisa Wall said she would introduce a private member's bill, the Marriage (Definition of Marriage) Amendment Bill, allowing same-sex couples to marry. The bill was submitted to the members' bill ballot on 30 May 2012. It was drawn from the ballot and passed its first and second readings on 29 August 2012 and 13 March 2013, respectively. The final reading passed on 17 April 2013 by 77 votes to 44. Supporters in the galleries greeted the bill's passage with applause and sang the traditional Māori love song "Pokarekare Ana", with many MPs joining in. Conservative lobby group Family First called its passage "an arrogant act of cultural vandalism". The bill received royal assent from Governor-General Jerry Mateparae on 19 April and took effect on 19 August 2013.

The Marriage (Definition of Marriage) Amendment Act 2013 amended the Marriage Act 1955 to include a definition of marriage explicitly allowing same-sex marriages and to amend other legislation as necessary. The definition reads: "marriage means the union of 2 people, regardless of their sex, sexual orientation, or gender identity". Prior to the passage of the Act, there was no explicit definition of marriage in New Zealand legislation.

31 same-sex couples married across New Zealand that Monday, 19 August 2013; 15 in Auckland, 6 in Wellington, 6 in Christchurch and 4 in Rotorua. Among the first couples to marry were Natasha Vitali and Melissa Ray in Auckland, who had won a competition on a radio show for an all-expenses paid ceremony. Lynley Bendall and Ally Wanikau were married in an Air New Zealand flight between Auckland and Queenstown in a ceremony attended by U.S. actor Jesse Tyler Ferguson.

In December 2016, in his first press conference after taking office, Prime Minister Bill English said he would vote in favour of same-sex marriage if another vote were to be held. He said, "I'd probably vote differently now on the gay marriage issue. I don't think that gay marriage is a threat to anyone else's marriage." English voted against the Civil Union Act 2004 and the Marriage (Definition of Marriage) Amendment Act 2013, and in favour of the Marriage (Gender Clarification) Amendment Bill 2005. Prime Minister Jacinda Ardern, in office between 2017 and 2022, supported same-sex marriage.

Economic impact
New Zealand has long been a destination for international weddings. From 2013, due to same-sex marriage not being legal in Australia and other Asian and Pacific countries, many same-sex couples from these countries took advantage of New Zealand's marriage law and got married in New Zealand. This proved highly beneficial for the country's economy. A 2016 study by Australia and New Zealand Banking Group economists estimated that Australian same-sex marriages were worth A$550 million a year and noted that "Australia's loss was New Zealand’s gain". Australian couples comprised 29 per cent of same-sex marriages or civil unions performed in New Zealand in 2016.

Marriage statistics
In the year after 19 August 2013 (when the law became operational), 926 same-sex marriages were registered in New Zealand, of which 520 were between female couples and 406 were between male couples. 532 marriages (57.5%) were between New Zealand citizens, and 237 marriages (25.6%) were between Australian citizens.

In 2016, 954 same-sex marriages and civil unions were performed in New Zealand. 483 of these unions were between couples living in New Zealand, while 471 were between couples who travelled from overseas, of which 58% came from Australia, 17% from China, 4% from the United Kingdom, another 4% from the United States and the remainder came from 25 other countries. Same-sex unions represented 4.1% of all unions performed in New Zealand that year.

Figures for 2020 and 2021 are lower than previous years because of the restrictions in place due to the COVID-19 pandemic.

Religious performance
Following years of consultations and debate, the general synod of the Anglican Church in Aotearoa, New Zealand and Polynesia voted in May 2018 to allow its ministers to bless same-sex civil marriages and unions. Ministers may offer their blessing to civil marriages but are not permitted to perform same-sex wedding ceremonies in the church.

Following the passage of the same-sex marriage legislation in Parliament, the Methodist Church of New Zealand responded that it would allow its parishes to perform same-sex marriages in its churches. A Methodist minister in Napier said, "If a parish is willing to have same-sex marriages happen in its church, but the incumbent minister is not comfortable, then it can invite a minister from another parish who is happy to perform the ceremony, and vice versa. If a minister is happy to perform and the parish is not, then the minister may seek to use another Methodist church that is accepting."

Public opinion

Opinion polls

Per the December 2012 Herald-DigiPoll, support for same-sex marriage varied by age: young people overwhelmingly supported same-sex marriage, whereas people above 65 were mostly opposed. A poll conducted by the Waikato Times in August 2012 found that 46% of Waikato residents supported same-sex marriage, while 39% were opposed.

Public opposition to same-sex marriage sharply increased during the time the same-sex marriage bill was being discussed by Parliament. LGBT groups attributed this increase to "scaremongering", while opponents claimed that "people are waking up to the negative social effects of changing the Marriage Act". However, opposition to same-sex marriage has significantly decreased since the bill has become law, being under 25% according to a 2016 poll.

A September–October 2016 survey by the Varkey Foundation found that 74% of 18–21-year-olds supported same-sex marriage in New Zealand.

Public campaigns

The Legalise Love campaign was launched in August 2011 to promote legal marriage and adoption equality in New Zealand, and a protest was organised at the New Zealand Parliament Buildings in October that year. In December 2012, former Governor-General Catherine Tizard starred in an online video campaign organised by the Campaign for Marriage Equality supporting same-sex marriage, alongside New Zealand singers Anika Moa, Boh Runga and Hollie Smith, as well as Olympian Danyon Loader. The Human Rights Commission, which also supports same-sex marriage, said that if the marriage bill is passed churches will not be forced to perform marriages between same-sex couples.

Public opposition to same-sex marriage has come from the Catholic Church in New Zealand, as well as from the Conservative Party and Family First. In June 2012, Family First leader Bob McCoskrie announced the launch of a new website, "Protect Marriage NZ", which outlines reasons for opposing same-sex marriage in New Zealand, which subsequently crashed on its first day after a large scale denial-of-service attack. A petition with 50,000 signatures expressing opposition to same-sex marriage was presented to Parliament in August 2012, in the lead-up to the first reading of the Marriage (Definition of Marriage) Amendment Bill. During the last fortnight before the third reading debate, several conservative Christian organisations held "prayer rallies" outside the New Zealand Beehive and in Auckland and Wellington against the enactment of same-sex marriage. Anika Moa, who came out as a lesbian in 2007, was planning a free concert in Christchurch for the night of the third reading of the bill to "celebrate a historic milestone for same-sex couples".

In March 2013, the youth wings of all eight parties represented in Parliament jointly announced their support for the bill, including the youth wing of New Zealand First, whose MPs had said that they were going to vote against it.

After the third reading of the Marriage (Definition of Marriage) Amendment Act 2013, Conservative Party Leader Colin Craig called the legalisation of same-sex marriage a "failure of democracy", and warned "the day of reckoning" would come. At the 2014 elections, the Conservative Party failed to enter Parliament because it polled below New Zealand's mixed member proportional electoral system's five percent threshold for party list-only representation. No other New Zealand political party has shown any inclination to revisit the issue; however, Family First continues to operate its "Protect Marriage NZ" website.

See also

 Marriage in New Zealand
 LGBT in New Zealand
 LGBT rights in New Zealand
 Recognition of same-sex unions in Oceania

Notes

References

External links
 Marriage Act 1955, New Zealand Legislation

LGBT law in New Zealand
LGBT rights in New Zealand
New Zealand
Marriage in New Zealand
2013 in New Zealand law
2013 in LGBT history
2013 in New Zealand